Lovanium University was a Catholic Jesuit university in Kinshasa in the Belgian Congo. The university was established in 1954 on the Kimwenza plateau, near Kinshasa. The university continued to function after independence until it was merged into the National University of Zaire in 1971. It can be considered an antecedent of the University of Kinshasa.

Early history
Before the foundation of Lovanium, the Catholic University of Louvain already operated multiple institutes for higher education in the Belgian Congo. The Fomulac (Fondation médicale de l'université de Louvain au Congo), was founded in 1926, with the goal of forming Congolese medical personnel and researchers specialized in tropical medicine. In 1932 the Catholic University of Louvain founded the Cadulac (Centres agronomiques de l'université de Louvain au Congo) in Kisantu. Cadulac was specialized in agricultural sciences and formed the basis for what was later to become Lovanium.

Lovanium
The university was established in 1954 on the Kimwenza plateau, near Leopoldville (now Kinshasa). 
Lovanium was founded by the Catholic University of Leuven in Belgium, and was named after it (Lovanium being Latin for Leuven).
When it opened, the university received heavy subsidies from the colonial government, it also received funding from the Ford Foundation, the Rockefeller Foundation and the United States Agency for International Development and was lauded as the best university in Africa. The official opening of the university was in 1954, the first students were to graduate from Lovanium in 1958.

Africa's first nuclear reactor, TRIGA I, was established at Lovanium in 1958, in conjunction with the U.S. Atoms for Peace program.

In August 1971, the university merged with two other universities in the Congo to form the federalised National University of Zaire (Université Nationale du Zaïre, UNAZA). Between 1980 and 1991, the universities were again divided into three institutions, the University of Kinshasa, Kisangani University, and the University of Lubumbashi.

Notable alumni
 Valentin Y. Mudimbe
 Clémentine Nzuji
 Étienne Tshisekedi
 Simon Mbatshi Batshia
 Pius Ngandu Nkashama
 Albert Ndele
 Barthélémy Bisengimana
 Jacques Depelchin
 Jean-Jacques Muyembe-Tamfum
 Nkulu Mitumba Kilombo
 Angela Okolo

Notable faculty
Marcel Lihau
Sophie Kanza
Daniel Biebuyck

See also
 List of Jesuit sites

References

External links
 The New Yorker 1962 article
 History of Higher Education

 
Education in Kinshasa
Former Catholic universities and colleges
History of Kinshasa
Educational institutions disestablished in 1971
Catholic Church in the Democratic Republic of the Congo
Universities in the Democratic Republic of the Congo
1954 establishments in the Belgian Congo
1971 disestablishments in Africa
Ž